The Beebe Railroad Station is a historic railroad station building located on Center Street in Beebe, Arkansas.  It is a single-story brick building, with a broad hip roof with overhanging eaves supported by large brackets.  It was built in 1910 by the Missouri-Pacific Railroad, and is one of the best-preserved of this type of station in the state.  It is also a reminder of the importance of the railroad in Beebe's original development, which was entirely dependent on the railroad.

The station was listed on the National Register of Historic Places in 1979.

See also
National Register of Historic Places listings in White County, Arkansas

References

Railway stations on the National Register of Historic Places in Arkansas
Railway stations in the United States opened in 1910
Buildings and structures in Beebe, Arkansas
National Register of Historic Places in White County, Arkansas
Former Missouri Pacific Railroad stations
1910 establishments in Arkansas
Former railway stations in Arkansas
Transportation in White County, Arkansas